Arixenia is a genus of earwigs, one of only two genera in the family Arixeniidae, and contains two species.

See also 
 Earwig

References

External links 
 An example specimen of the species Arixenia esau from the Tree of Life (note that the species is incorrectly labeled)
 An example of a female Arixenia esau from the Australian National Insect Collection 

Dermaptera genera
Arixeniina